South Marsh Island Wildlife Management Area is a Wildlife Management Area in Somerset County, Maryland.

External links
 South Marsh Island Wildlife Management Area

Marshes of Maryland
Wildlife management areas of Maryland
Protected areas of Somerset County, Maryland
Landforms of Somerset County, Maryland